Matlapana is a village in North-West District of Botswana. It is located north-east of the district capital Maun. The population was 1,169 in 2001 census.

References

North-West District (Botswana)
Villages in Botswana